The governor-general of Taiwan was the head of the Government-General of Taiwan in the Japanese era (including Formosa and the Pescadores) when they were part of the Empire of Japan, from 1895 to 1945.

The Japanese governors-general were members of the Diet, civilian officials, Japanese nobles or generals. They exercised their power on behalf of the sovereign of Taiwan (the emperor of Japan) until the dissolution of the empire when the dominion came under administration of the Republic of China and was renounced by Japan.

Governors-general

Timeline

See also
 Governor of Formosa
 Governor of Taiwan Province
 Japanese Governor-General of Korea
 List of Japanese governors-general of Korea
 History of Taiwan
 Japanese Resident-General of Korea
 List of Japanese residents-general of Korea
 List of rulers of Taiwan
 Political divisions of Taiwan (1895–1945)
 Railway Department of the Office of the Governor-General of Taiwan
 Taiwan after World War II
 Timeline of Taiwanese history

References

External links
Archives of the Japanese Taiwan Governor-Generals (Chinese)
Japanese Governors of Taiwan (Mandarin)

 
Taiwan under Japanese rule